Marangaluy-e Kuchek (also Romanized as Marangalūy-e Kūchek; also known as Marangalū-ye Kūchek and Marāngalū-ye Kūchek) is a village in Nazluy-ye Jonubi Rural District, in the Central District of Urmia County, West Azerbaijan Province, Iran. At the 2006 census, its population was 87, in 26 families.

References 

Populated places in Urmia County